Northwood Middle School may refer to:

 Northwood Middle School (Arkansas), in North Little Rock, Arkansas
 Northwood Middle School (Illinois), in Woodstock, Illinois
 Northwood Middle School, in Fort Wayne, Indiana
 Northwood Middle School, in Elyria City School District in Elyria, Ohio
 Northwood Middle School, in Northwood Local School District in Northwood, Ohio
 Northwood Middle School, in Greenville County School District in Taylors, South Carolina
 Northwood High School (Saltville, Virginia), in Saltville, Virginia
 Northwood Middle School, in Kent School District in Renton, Washington
 Northwood Middle School (Spokane, Washington), in Spokane, Washington